BladeSystem is a line of blade server machines from Hewlett Packard Enterprise (Formerly Hewlett-Packard) that was introduced in June 2006.

The BladeSystem forms part of the HPE Converged Systems platform, which use a common converged infrastructure architecture for server, storage, and networking products. Designed for enterprise installations of 100 to more than 1,000 Virtual machines, the HP ConvergedSystem 700 is configured with BladeSystem servers. When managing a software-defined data center, a System administrator can perform automated lifecycle management for BladeSystems using HPE OneView for converged infrastructure management.

The BladeSystem allows users to build a high density system, up to 128 servers in each rack.

Components

Enclosures 
HPE currently offers 2 types of enclosures in its c-Class BladeSystem lineup succeeding the p-Class BladeSystem

c7000 
The BladeSystem c7000 enclosure has had multiple versions, the first version of which was announced in June 2006. In 2007 there was a minor update to the first version that included a larger Onboard Administrator display (3 inches, up from 2 inches). The next update (second version) was in 2009 and brought RoHS compatibility, increased backplane speed (5 Tbit/s, up from 4 Tbit/s), 1 Gbit/s Onboard Administrator connectivity, and increased blade connectivity options like: 2x 10 Gbit/s Ethernet support, 4x QDR or 1x FDR InfiniBand port support, and 6 Gbit/s SAS. The third version of the c7000 enclosure, called the c7000 Platinum Enclosure was released in February 2013. It features location discovery services, thermal discovery services and redesigned backplane. The new backplane increased aggregate bandwidth 40% from 5 to 7 Tbit/s to allow use newest high-speed interconnect modules (such as 16 Gbit/s FC and multiple ports of 56 Gbit/s FDR InfiniBand). Also the new Platinum Plus rating power supplies were announced with higher efficiency than previous Gold Plus rating power supplies.

All versions of the enclosure occupy 10 rack units and can accommodate up to 16 half-height blade servers. It includes space for 6 power supplies (single-phase, three-phase or a −48V DC), 10 cooling fans, 8 single-wide (such as 1/10 Gbit/s Ethernet or 8/16 Gbit/s FC) or 4 double-wide (such as 40 Gbit/s Ethernet or Infiniband) interconnect modules (that allows for up to 4 redundant interconnect fabrics)

c3000 
The HPE c3000 enclosure was announced in August 2007. Updated version of the enclosure called c3000 Platinum was announced in February 2013.

All versions of the enclosure occupy 6 rack units or can be used as a standalone unit (with optional tower conversion kit) It can accommodate up to 8 half-height blade servers. It includes space for 6 power supplies (single-phase, or a -48V DC), 6 cooling fans, 4 single-wide or 2 single-wide and one double-wide interconnect modules

p-Class 
Taking up 6 rack units, the p-Class enclosure can house 16 Half height, 8 Full-height or 2 Quad-wide p blades. There are two interconnect modules on the front allowing for different connectivity options such as Fibre channel. Power is managed by a Powerenclosure; 1u 6x PSU single-phase or 6x PSU three-phase / 48v DC 3u enclosures. The two types of backplanes determine what blades are supported; the standard backplane supports BL20p and BL25p blades whereas the enhanced backplane supports BL20p, BL25p, BL30p, BL35p, BL40p, BL45p, and BL60p (All generations).

Server blades 
HPE has offered general-purpose Proliant server blades (based on Intel Xeon and AMD Opteron CPUs) as well as Integrity (based on the Intel Itanium CPU) and specialized ProLiant blades aimed at workstation virtualization. Blades can use half-height/full-height and single-wide/double-wide/quad-wide form factors. Apart from built-in 1 Gbit/s Ethernet network adapters, optional mezzanine cards can be installed on the blades to further increase connectivity options. These can include more network adapters, HBA/RAID Cards, SAN Fibre Channel Cards, and GPUs up to Nvidia Quadro FX 2800M via the (WS460c). WS ProLiant Blades can have a half-height GPU Blade that can be installed to accommodate full-height double graphics cards

Networking 

Several connectivity options are available for the HPE BladeSystem:
 HPE Virtual Connect modules
 HPE Aruba networking switches
 Cisco Ethernet and Fibre Channel switches and fabric extenders
 Broadcom Fibre Channel switches and pass-through modules
 Mellanox Infiniband

Storage 
Storage options include:
 Internal server HDDs (usually 2 to 4 with hot-swap capabilities)
 Internal USB, SD or microSD slot
 Connecting to external SAN via FC, SAS or iSCSI; enabled by the use of a mezzanine I/O card
 Storage blade (with large number of internal HDD's)
 Tape blade (half-height blade unit hosting LTO tape drive and designed to connect to adjacent blade server)

References 

Server hardware
Blade servers
HP servers
Ultra-dense servers
Computer-related introductions in 2004